Michael  Churm is a paralympic athlete from Great Britain competing mainly in category T37 sprint events.

Michael has competed in the sprint events at two Paralympics, firstly in 2000 Summer Paralympics where he competed in the T37 100m and then won a silver medal with his teammates in the T38 4 × 100 m relay.  After missing the 2004 Paralympic Games due to injury that was sustained at the British Trials Michael continued and successfully gained selection for the Great Britain NI Team at the 2008 Paralympic Games in Beijing, China where he made both the T37 100m and 200m Finals.

References

Paralympic athletes of Great Britain
Athletes (track and field) at the 2000 Summer Paralympics
Athletes (track and field) at the 2008 Summer Paralympics
Paralympic silver medalists for Great Britain
Living people
Medalists at the 2000 Summer Paralympics
Year of birth missing (living people)
Paralympic medalists in athletics (track and field)
British male sprinters